Nesbyen Station is a railway station located at Nesbyen Nes, Norway. The station is served by six daily express trains operated by Vy Tog. The station was opened as part of the Bergen Line between Bergen and Gulsvik in 1907.

External links
 Jernbaneverket's page on Nesbyen

Railway stations in Buskerud
Railway stations on Bergensbanen
Railway stations opened in 1907
Nes, Buskerud